The following is a list of events affecting Mexican television in 2018. Events listed include television show debuts, finales, and cancellations; channel launches, closures, and re-brandings; stations changing or adding their network affiliations; and information about controversies and carriage disputes.

Events
Most television stations in Mexico were required to change frequencies to repurpose the 600 MHz band for use by mobile services. 
September - Tecate, Baja California-licensed XHDTV-TDT in the Tijuana market, the final English-language television station in western Mexico, disaffiliates from the American-based MyNetworkTV programming service in favor of the Monterrey, Nuevo Leon-based Milenio Televisión network. MyNetworkTV was moved to The CW-affiliated KFMB-DT2 in San Diego as a secondary affiliation. This left CW affiliate XHRIO-TDT in Matamoros, Tamaulipas as the only English-language television station licensed in Mexico.

Television shows

Debuts
Casa de las Flores (2018–present) 
LOL: Last One Laughing (2018-2019)

Programs on-air

1970s
Plaza Sesamo (1972–present)

1990s
Acapulco Bay (1995–present) 
Corazon salvaje (1993–present) 
Esmeralda (1997–present) 
La usurpadora (1998–present)

2000s
Alma de hierro (2008–present) 
Big Brother México (2002-2005, 2015–present)
Hotel Erotica Cabo (2006–present) 
Lo Que Callamos Las Mujeres (2001–present)

2010s
40 y 20 (2016–present) 
Atrapada (2018–present) 
Casa de las Flores (2018–present)
Como dice el dicho (2011–present) 
El Chiapo (2017–present) 
La Voz… México (2011–present) 
Por amar sin ley (2018–present) 
México Tiene Talento (2014–present) 
Rubirosa (2018–present) 
Sin tu mirads (2017–present) 
Valiant Love (2012–present)

Television stations

Station launches

Network affiliation changes

Station closures

Deaths

See also
List of Mexican films of 2018
2018 in Mexico

References